Halcyon Days is the reissue of English singer Ellie Goulding's second studio album, Halcyon (2012). It was released on 23 August 2013 by Polydor Records. Following the release of Halcyon, Goulding announced that she had plans to repackage the original album, with new songs that focused on electronic music. For the reissue, Goulding recorded 10 new songs and worked with a variety of producers, including Ryan Tedder, Calvin Harris and Greg Kurstin, to create her desired sound.

Upon release, Halcyon Days was met with widespread acclaim from most music critics, who praised the album's musical expansion, its production and happier lyrical content. Commercially the reissue was a success and helped propel the original album on numerous charts. The lead single from the reissued album, "Burn", was released on 5 July 2013, becoming Goulding's first number-one single on the UK Singles Chart. The song also reached the top five in Germany and Ireland, and the top 10 in Australia, France and New Zealand. "How Long Will I Love You" and "Goodness Gracious" were subsequently released as the second and third singles from Halcyon Days, respectively. A second reissue titled Halcyon Nights, in honor of the original album's tenth anniversary, was released on October 12, 2022.

Background 
In late July 2012, it was announced that Goulding's second studio album would be titled Halcyon, to be released on 8 October 2012. The album was preceded by the lead single "Anything Could Happen" on 21 August. The album was well received by critics and debuted at number two on the UK Albums Chart and at number one on the UK Download Albums Chart, selling 33,425 copies in its first week.
The album was further promoted with the release of two more singles – Figure 8 and Explosions – as well as a tour.
In an interview with Elle in July 2013, Goulding announced plans to release a repackaged version of Halcyon with new songs, commenting, "I have such an affinity with electronic music that I can't step away from it."

New content 

Halcyon Days features 10 new tracks, with the first being "Burn", "a celebration of life in its purest form", as described by Idolator's Kathy Iandoli. The track is a pop song with rave influences, while her vocals are crowded with echoes and distortion. According to Goulding, the song is "probably the most poppy song I've released. But it's all me. I wanted to release 'Burn', I loved it, even if it is a vague sentiment. I think it's a truly great song." "Goodness Gracious" follows, being described by Nicole Frehsee of Rolling Stone as "a blippy ode to fickleness." It was co-written with Fun's Nate Ruess, with Goulding noting that the song "is about dissing yourself for not thinking straight and not being fair. I've been in situations where I knew someone wasn't right for me, yet I kept bringing them back", she claimed. "You My Everything" and "Flashlight" (with DJ Fresh) "take Goulding's natural inclination for electronic beats and mix them with the soulful undertone of her vocals", as stated by Iandoli. "Stay Awake" celebrates "not sleeping and partying all night" over triumphant synth stabs, as highlighted by Frehsee. "It's less serious content than I'd usually write about", Goulding claimed. "But I've always been a fan of club songs that feel good."

Fourth track "Hearts Without Chains" was described as "an affecting piano-based ballad about healing and moving forward". It was co-written by Fraser T. Smith, who produced Adele's "Set Fire to the Rain". "It's my favorite song of the batch", says Goulding. "It has a folky English quality to it. Plus, it's quite nice to listen to and not be in the state I was when I wrote it." "Under Control" "reclaims empowerment and confidence ('I feel like I'm breathing again'), while wrapped in a mix of fuzzy bass and echoed clanks", as declared by Digital Spy's Lewis Corner. The other three tracks on the album are covers. The first, "How Long Will I Love You?", was originally released by The Waterboys and Goulding transforms it into a sweet, contemplative ballad. It was part of the soundtrack for Richard Curtis' romantic comedy film About Time. The second, Alt-J's "Tessellate" loses some of its cryptic airs as Goulding reveals different layers, featuring a "seductive makeover with Chiddy Bang's Xaphoon Jones on the beat." Finally, Midnight Star's "Midas Touch" is turned inside out into a fittingly atmospheric declaration of self, having a darker tone.

Critical reception 

Halcyon Days received acclaim from most music critics. Ken Capobianco of Boston Globe noted that "The expanded edition of Ellie Goulding's fine 'Halcyon' is no mere recycling job, as it helps expand the range of her musical vision with 10 new tracks", claiming that "beneath the electronics lies real soul." Caren Ganz of Rolling Stone praised the album for "confirm[ing] [that] Goulding is doing her best work on clubby tracks with luminescent titles." Lewis Corner of Digital Spy opined that the album is "the moment Ellie firmly makes her mark in pop", since its original version "lacked enough upbeat ditties that the wider public seemingly crave." Kathy Iandoli of Idolator agreed, claiming that the album is "a progression into happier territory", and that it's "merely an extension of Ellie's awesomeness and a sonic timeline through happiness, heartbreak and more happiness."

Commercial performance 
Following the Halcyon Days re-release in August 2013, the album jumped from number 26 to number three on the UK Albums Chart, with sales of 15,883 units, achieving its then-highest chart placing since its debut. On 5 January 2014, in its 65th week on the chart, Halcyon climbed from number six to number one on the UK Albums Chart with 37,507 copies sold, becoming Goulding's second number-one album in the UK. It spent a second consecutive week at number one, selling 26,456 copies. The following week, the album sold 24,831 copies and fell to number two, before returning to the top spot for a third non-consecutive with sales of 20,928 copies.
In Ireland the Halcyon Days reissue propelled the album to number seven on the Irish chart for the week ending 29 August 2013, before rising yet again to number four on 19 December. The album eventually topped the Irish Albums Chart for the week ending 2 January 2014, more than a year after its original release and over four months after the re-release.

Singles 
"Burn" was released on 5 July 2013 as the first single from Halcyon Days. A fan-submitted Vine video for the song premiered on 4 July 2013, followed by the official music video on 7 July. The track became Goulding's first-ever number one on the UK Singles Chart, topping the chart for three consecutive weeks. "Burn" also attained commercial success internationally, reaching number one in Italy, the top five in Austria, Belgium, Finland, Germany, Ireland and Sweden, and the top 10 in Australia, France, New Zealand and Spain. The song was nominated for British Single of the Year and Best Video at the 2014 BRIT Awards.

The second single from Halcyon Days, "How Long Will I Love You", was released on 10 November 2013 as the official song for BBC Children in Need 2013 appeal. The single peaked at number three on the UK Singles Chart. "Goodness Gracious" was released on 21 February 2014 as the third single from Halcyon Days. The song reached number 16 on the UK Singles Chart. In an interview with Capital FM on 9 February 2014, DJ Fresh revealed that he and Goulding had recorded a new version of the song "Flashlight" for single release later in 2014. The reworked version of the song was released on 28 September 2014 as the fourth single from Fresh's forthcoming fourth studio album.

Release and promotion 
The reissue, titled Halcyon Days, was released on 26 August 2013 and contains ten additional tracks, including the lead single "Burn". The song "You My Everything", which was ultimately included on Halcyon Days, premiered on 1 July 2013 during the first episode of the final series of the British teen drama series Skins. "Under Control" was offered as a free download on Amazon UK on 21 August 2013. "Burn" was featured in the second episode of the fifth season of The Vampire Diaries on 10 October 2013, and "Tessellate" was used in the seventh episode of the third season of Revenge on 10 November.

Goulding performed "Burn" on the British and Italian editions of The X Factor on 13 October and 31 October 2013, respectively. She also promoted the single on The Ellen DeGeneres Show on 24 October 2013, on The Queen Latifah Show on 28 October, on NBC's The Voice on 26 November, on Late Show with David Letterman on 21 January 2014 and on Good Morning America on 22 January. Goulding delivered the first televised performance of "Goodness Gracious" on the British chat show The Graham Norton Show on 28 February 2014.

In honor of the original album's tenth anniversary, Goulding released a second reissue of Halcyon, titled Halcyon Nights, on October 12, 2022, and is a two-disc release containing a total of 31 tracks.

Track listing

Deluxe edition

2014 reissue

Halcyon Nights 

Notes
  signifies an additional producer
  signifies a remixer
  signifies a vocal producer

Personnel 
Credits adapted from the liner notes of the deluxe edition of Halcyon Days.

 Ellie Goulding – vocals, art direction
 Richard Andrews – design
 Beatriz Artola – engineering 
 Ben Baptie – mixing assistant 
 Burns – mixing, production 
 Nick Cornu – guitar 
 Dahi Divine – saxophone 
 Tom Elmhirst – mixing 
 Cory Enemy – production 
 John Fortis – bass, keyboards, production 
 Matti Free – guitar 
 DJ Fresh – mastering, mixing, production 
 Serban Ghenea – mixing 
 Cassandra Gracey – art direction
 John Hanes – mix engineering 
 Rob Katz – vocal engineering 
 Richard Kayvan – engineering, mixing 
 Joe Kearns – vocal engineering, vocal production ; engineering 
 Chris Ketley – piano 
 Ashley Krajewski – engineering, percussion 
 Greg Kurstin – engineering, guitar, production ; engineering, keyboards, programming ; vocal production 
 Robbie Lamond – drums, guitar, organ, piano, production, programming, strings 
 Rachael Lander – cello 
 Hugo Leclercq – arrangement, mastering, mixing, production, programming 
 Jamie Lillywhite – A&R
 Kirsty Mangan – viola, violin 
 Naweed – mastering 
 Oligee – production 
 Robert Orton – mixing 
 Alex Pasco – additional engineering 
 Simon Procter – photography
 Nate Ruess – backing vocals 
 Ryan Schwabe – mixing 
 Jesse Shatkin – engineering ; additional engineering 
 Sigma – additional production 
 Fraser T Smith – bass guitar, drum programming, keyboards, mixing, production, programming 
 Ryan Tedder – vocal production 
 Sean Walsh – additional engineering 
 Eg White – vocal production 
 Xaphoon Jones – mixing, production

Charts

Weekly charts

Year-end charts

Certifications

Release history

References 

2013 albums
Albums produced by Calvin Harris
Albums produced by Fraser T. Smith
Cherrytree Records albums
Ellie Goulding albums
Interscope Geffen A&M Records albums
Interscope Records albums
Polydor Records albums
Reissue albums
Albums produced by Ash Howes
Albums produced by Richard Stannard (songwriter)